Maryna Lytovchenko (born 26 May 1991) is a Ukrainian para table tennis player who has mild cerebral palsy.

References

1991 births
Living people
Sportspeople from Kharkiv
Ukrainian female table tennis players
Table tennis players at the 2016 Summer Paralympics
Medalists at the 2016 Summer Paralympics
Paralympic medalists in table tennis
Paralympic bronze medalists for Ukraine
Table tennis players at the 2020 Summer Paralympics